League or The League may refer to:

 League (unit), traditional unit of length of three miles or an hour's walk
 League (non-profit), a program for service learning
 The League (app), a dating app
 Confederation, a union of sovereign groups or states united for common action

Arts and entertainment
 Leagues (band), an American rock band
 The League, an American sitcom broadcast on FX and FXX about fantasy football
 League of Legends, a 2009 multiplayer online battle arena video game, often called "league"

Sports
 Sports league
 Rugby league, full contact football code, often referred to as just "league"

See also